NKRF may refer to:
NKRF (gene)
National Kidney Research Fund, former name of Kidney Research UK